The Sauldre is a  long river in central France, a right tributary of the Cher. Its source is near the village of Montigny, southwest of Sancerre. The Sauldre flows generally northwest, through the following departments and towns:

 Cher: Vailly-sur-Sauldre, Argent-sur-Sauldre
 Loir-et-Cher: Salbris, Romorantin-Lanthenay

The Sauldre flows into the Cher near Selles-sur-Cher.

The Rère, Grande Sauldre and Petite Sauldre are among its tributaries.

References

Rivers of France
Rivers of Centre-Val de Loire
Rivers of Cher (department)
Rivers of Loir-et-Cher